Zeilleriidae is a family of brachiopods belonging to the order Terebratulida.

Genera

Genera:
 Advenina Sandy, 1986
 Ajukuzella Ovtsharenko, 1983
 Antiptychina Zittel, 1880

References

Terebratulida